Charlie Leland Rowland (July 23, 1899, Warrenton, North Carolina—January 21, 1992, Raleigh, North Carolina) was an American Major League Baseball catcher. He played in five games for the Philadelphia Athletics during the  season, four at catcher.

References

External links

Major League Baseball catchers
Philadelphia Athletics players
Baseball players from North Carolina
People from Warrenton, North Carolina
1899 births
1992 deaths